The 1987 Cardiff City Council election was held on Thursday 7 May 1987 to the district council known as Cardiff City Council, in Cardiff, South Glamorgan, Wales. It took place on the same day as other district council elections in Wales and England. The Conservative Party lost control of the council, though the Labour Party were unable to regain an overall majority.

The previous Cardiff City Council election took place in 1983 and the next full elections took place in 1991.

Overview
Prior to the elections the Conservatives had a majority of three on the council. National opinion polls showed Labour was gaining in popularity, particularly on local issues. In Cardiff the Conservatives were also facing a challenge from the SDP-Liberal Alliance.

All 65 council seats were up for election, in 26 electoral wards. The Conservatives lost ten seats overall, while Labour increased their representation by one. The Alliance won nine additional seats, particularly in the centre of the city, within the boundaries of the Cardiff Central constituency. Labour became the largest party, though four short of having a majority. The Labour group leader, John Reynolds, pledged to run a minority administration.

Prominent councillors who lost their seats included former Lord Mayor, Olwen Watkin; the council's finance chairman, Roy Hennessy; and Tony John, chairman of Cardiff Bus. In the Gabalfa ward a police investigation was launched into alleged voting irregularities after the winning Labour councillor, David Hutchinson, had increased his majority to four times more than his 1983 result.

|}

Ward Results
Contests were held in all twenty-six wards:(a)(b)

Adamsdown (2 seats)

Butetown (1 seat)

Caerau (2 seats)

Canton (3 seats)

Cathays (3 seats)

Cyncoed (3 seats)

Ely (3 seats)

Fairwater (3 seats)

Gabalfa (1 seat)

Grangetown (3 seats)

Heath (3 seats)

Lisvane and St Mellons (1 seat)

Llandaff (2 seats)

Llandaff North (2 seats)

Llanishen (3 seats)

Llanrumney (3 seats)

Pentwyn (3 seats)

Plasnewydd (4 seats)

Radyr & St Fagans (1 seat)

Rhiwbina (3 seats)

Riverside (3 seats)

Roath (3 seats)

Rumney (2 seats)

Splott (2 seats)

Trowbridge (2 seats)

Whitchurch & Tongwynlais (4 seats) 

(a) Elections Centre source also indicates whether candidate is female; compares the percentage vote of the lead candidate for each party in the ward
(b) South Wales Echo source also indicates 'retiring' ward councillors. It fails to include the Lisvane & St Mellons ward results.
(c) South Wales Echo lists Plasnewydd candidates G. Harris as Alliance and D. Evans as Conservative (which gives 4 candidates for each of these parties). Vote percentages shown reflect this.
(d) The Elections Centre source muddles the Conservative J. Sainsbury and Green Party's G. Unwin.
(e) The Elections Centre source wrongly identifies the Alliance candidate S. Soffa as a Liberal. Vote percentages shown correct this.

* pre-existing 'retiring' ward councillors at this election

References

Council elections in Cardiff
Cardiff City Council
1980s in Cardiff
Council elections in South Glamorgan